The mayor of Davao City is the chief executive of the government of Davao City in the Philippines. The mayor leads the city's departments in executing ordinances and delivering public services. The mayorship is a three-year term and each mayor is restricted to three consecutive terms, totaling nine years, although a mayor can be elected again after an interruption of one term.

The current mayor of Davao City is Sebastian Duterte, the son of former Philippine President Rodrigo Duterte.

History 
On March 16, 1936, Davao Assemblyman, Romualdo C. Quimpo, filed a bill seeking to create the chartered City of Davao. This bill would later be signed by President Manuel L. Quezon as Commonwealth Act No. 51 on October 16, 1936. Davao City shall then be governed by a Mayor as an independent City.

In 1967, the Province of Davao was divided into three provinces: Davao del Norte, Davao Oriental and Davao del Sur. Geographically, Davao City became part of Davao del Sur; but was no longer its provincial capital. It became the commercial center of Southern Mindanao. This period also saw the election of an indigenous person to the Office of the Mayor of Davao City, when Elias B. Lopez, a full-blooded Bagobo, won the elections in 1967.

In 1972, Davao City became the regional administrative capital of Southern Mindanao. Thereafter, upon its reorganization as the regional capital of the Davao Region (Region XI), it was the sole highly urbanized city in the Davao Region.

In 1986, President Corazon Aquino appointed Rodrigo Duterte, as OIC Vice Mayor. Duterte later ran for Mayor and won, taking the top post from 1988 to 1998, from 2001 to 2010, and yet again from 2013 to 2016. The incumbent City Mayor is his youngest child, Sebastian Z. Duterte.

Notable Mayors

Santiago Artiaga 
Before claiming the honor as Davao City’s first sitting mayor, Santiago Artiaga (1878-1962), one of the first pensionados (state scholars) during American occupation, was already a colorful, if controversial, figure in Manila. As city engineer, the highest position next to the mayor, he had clashes with the city council and, as acting city mayor, was the envy of his detractors.

In 1933, he filed an early retirement from public service, but this was not accepted. He continued to serve as city engineer until 1936 when he resigned to accept the appointment as de jure city mayor of Zamboanga. Two weeks thereafter, he was reassigned to Davao as first sitting city mayor.

For nearly three years he served diligently as local chief executive but had to leave after the President plucked him out for another assignment. On October 13, 1939, Malacañan announced his appointment as the new governor of Bukidnon, replacing Agustin L. Alvarez who took over as the new Davao City mayor.

Rodrigo Duterte 

Lawyer and politician Rodrigo Duterte served seven terms as mayor of Davao City in the Philippines. In 2016, he became the 16th president of the Philippines.

Rodrigo Duterte was born on March 28, 1945, in Maasin, Southern Leyte, Philippines. His father, Vicente, served as a local mayor and governor, and his mother, Soledad, was a teacher and a community activist.

Duterte's rise from the legal ranks to politician began when he was named special counsel at the City Prosecution Office of Davao City in 1977. He became assistant city prosecutor two years later, and in 1986 he was elected vice mayor of Davao City.

Nicknamed the "Punisher" for his controversial methods, Duterte nevertheless was successful in reducing crime. Furthermore, he was credited with helping to make Davao City cleaner by enforcing a smoking ban, and for his LGBT-friendly measures. His popularity was such that he served seven terms as mayor, sidestepping term limits with stints as a congressman and vice mayor, and drew huge ratings with a weekly television program "Gikan sa Masa, Para sa Masa."

Sara Duterte 
Sara Duterte is the mayor of Davao City twice - during the first half of second Aquino presidency and during the entire presidency of her father. She became the city's first female mayor and the youngest to ever be elected in its history. She is the daughter of President Rodrigo Duterte who also served as mayor of the southern city for several terms before seeking the country's second-highest office.

Duterte is the running-mate and vice president of Bongbong Marcos, a former senator who is also the son of the late President Ferdinand Marcos. She entered the vice presidential race at the last hour via substitution after initially claiming that she had no interest in seeking a national post.

List

List of Mayors of Davao City

Vice Mayor of Davao City
The Vice Mayor is the second-highest official of the city.  The vice mayor is elected via popular vote; although most mayoral candidates have running mates, the vice mayor is elected separately from the mayor. This can result in the mayor and the vice mayor coming from different political parties.

The Vice Mayor is the presiding officer of the Davao City Council, although he can only vote as the tiebreaker. When a mayor is removed from office, the vice mayor becomes the mayor until the scheduled next election. Jesus Melchor Quitain Jr. assumed the post on June 30, 2022.

References

Local government in Davao City
Davao City